Svenska Serien 1923–24, part of the 1923–24 Swedish football season, was the tenth and last Svenska Serien season played, as it was replaced by Allsvenskan. Örgryte IS won the league ahead of runners-up AIK, while Djurgårdens IF were relegated.

Participating clubs

League tables

Östra

Västra

Championship play-offs

Promotions, relegations and qualifications

Results

Östra

Västra

References 

Print

Online

 

1923-24
Sweden
1